The Pioneer League is an independent baseball league that operates in the Rocky Mountain region of the United States. Its teams are not directly affiliated with Major League Baseball (MLB). It is designated as an MLB Partner League.

From 1939 to 2020, the Pioneer League was affiliated with Minor League Baseball and its teams were affiliated with MLB teams. It operated as a Class C league from 1939 to 1942 and from 1946 to 1962. It was elevated to Class A for 1963 and was a Rookie-level league from 1964 to 2020.

History
The Pioneer League began in 1939 with six teams in Idaho and Utah, operating at the Class C level. The original six teams were the Boise Pilots, Lewiston Indians, Ogden Reds, Pocatello Cardinals, Salt Lake City Bees, and Twin Falls Cowboys. With players in short supply due to World War II, the league suspended operations for the 1943 through 1945 seasons.

In 1948, the league expanded by adding two teams in Montana; the Billings Mustangs and Great Falls Electrics. In these early years, teams in the league either operated independently or were affiliated with Major League Baseball (MLB) or Pacific Coast League (PCL) parent clubs, as the PCL was attempting to grow (but ultimately failed) into a major league. When MLB's Los Angeles Dodgers displaced the PCL's Hollywood Stars in 1958, the Stars relocated and became the "new" Salt Lake City Bees, remaining in the PCL and taking away the Pioneer League's largest market.

By 1959, the Pioneer League was down to six teams; Billings and Great Falls along with the Boise Braves, Idaho Falls Russets, Missoula Timberjacks, and Pocatello Athletics. The league operated at the Class A level for one year (1963), before changing to Rookie league in 1964, when there were only four teams in the league; the Idaho Falls Angels, Magic Valley Cowboys, Pocatello Chiefs, and Treasure Valley Cubs. By 1978, the league had again grown to eight teams — Billings and Idaho Falls along with the Butte Copper Kings, Calgary Cardinals, Great Falls Giants, Helena Phillies, Lethbridge Dodgers, and Medicine Hat Blue Jays. With the exception of 1986 (when there were six teams), there have been eight teams in the league since then.

In 2016, total league attendance was 616,686, down slightly from the 2015 total of 633,622.

In its final years as an MLB-affiliated league, the Pioneer League was one of two "Rookie Advanced" minor leagues along with the Appalachian League. As such, it occupied the second-lowest rung in the minor league ladder. 
Although classified as a Rookie league, the level of play was slightly higher than that of the two "complex" Rookie leagues, the Gulf Coast League and Arizona League. Unlike the complex leagues, Pioneer League teams charged admission and sold concessions. It was almost exclusively the first fully professional league in which many players competed; most of the players had just been signed out of high school. It was a short-season league that competed from late June (when major league teams signed players whom they selected in the amateur draft) to early September.

After the 2018 season, the Helena Brewers relocated to Colorado Springs, Colorado, where they now play as the Rocky Mountain Vibes.

As the start of the 2020 season was postponed due to the COVID-19 pandemic before being cancelled on June 30, making the 2019 season the league's last as an MLB-affiliated league of Minor League Baseball.

In conjunction with the reorganization of Minor League Baseball in 2021, the Pioneer League was converted to an independent baseball league and was granted status as an MLB Partner League. The reconfigured league continued with the same franchises using the same identities, with the exception of the Orem Owlz who relocated to Windsor, Colorado, as the Northern Colorado Owlz. The Boise Hawks also joined the Pioneer League in 2021 after moving from the Northwest League.

The Pioneer League announced a five-year naming rights deal between the league and ticket vendor TicketSmarter that would have the league go as The Pioneer Baseball League presented by TicketSmarter starting in time for the 2022 season.

Current teams

Current team rosters

Pioneer League teams (1939–present)
Bold text indicates active teams.

Billings Mustangs
Boise Braves
Boise Hawks
Boise Pilots
Boise Yankees
Butte Copper Kings
Caldwell Cubs
Calgary Cardinals
Calgary Expos
Casper Ghosts
Casper Rockies
Gate City Pioneers
Glacier Range Riders
Great Falls Dodgers
Great Falls Electrics
Great Falls Giants
Great Falls Selectrics
Great Falls Voyagers
Great Falls White Sox
Grand Junction Jackalopes
Grand Junction Rockies
Helena Brewers
Helena Gold Sox
Helena Phillies
Idaho Falls A's
Idaho Falls Angels
Idaho Falls Braves
Idaho Falls Chukars
Idaho Falls Gems
Idaho Falls Nuggets
Idaho Falls Padres
Idaho Falls Russets
Idaho Falls Yankees
Lethbridge Black Diamonds
Lethbridge Dodgers
Lethbridge Expos
Lethbridge Mounties
Lewiston Indians
Magic Valley Cowboys
Medicine Hat A's
Medicine Hat Blue Jays
Missoula Osprey
Missoula PaddleHeads
Missoula Timberjacks
Northern Colorado Owlz
Ogden Dodgers
Ogden Raptors
Ogden Reds
Ogden Spikers
Orem Owlz
Pocatello A's
Pocatello Bannocks
Pocatello Cardinals
Pocatello Chiefs
Pocatello Gems
Pocatello Giants
Pocatello Pioneers
Pocatello Posse
Provo Angels
Rocky Mountain Vibes
Salt Lake City Bees
Salt Lake City Giants
Salt Lake City Trappers
Treasure Valley Cubs
Twin Falls Cowboys

Teams by city

Staff 
Mike Shapiro is the current president of the Pioneer Baseball League, having been a senior executive in a wide range of professional sports including baseball, golf, basketball and hockey.

Jim McCurdy is the commissioner and a past president of the Pioneer Baseball League. McCurdy received his BBA from the University of Houston in 1970 and his JD from the University of Texas School of Law in 1974. He mediated the restructure of Minor League Baseball's governing structure in 1992 and was an inaugural member of the MiLB board of trustees from 1992 to 1994. In 1993, he was appointed by the president of MiLB to serve on the Professional Baseball Executive Council. McCurdy was elevated to the position of league president in 1994, replacing Ralph Nelles who was the president from 1975 to 1993. McCurdy also teaches sports law courses at Gonzaga University School of Law and the University of San Diego School of Law. His publications include: Sports Law: Cases & Materials (with Ray Yasser, C. Peter Goplerud, and Maureen Weston) (7th ed. LexisNexis 2011), Thunder on the Road from Seattle to Oklahoma City: Going from NOPA to ZOPA in the NBA, in Legal Issues in American Basketball ch. IV (Lewis Kurlantzick ed., Academica Press 2011), and, The Fundamental Nature of Professional Sports Leagues, Constituent Clubs, & Mutual Duties to Protect Market Opportunities: Organized Baseball Case Study, in Legal Issues in Professional Baseball ch. IV (Lewis Kurlantzick ed., Academica Press 2005).

League champions

League champions have been determined by different means since the Pioneer League's formation in 1939. There were postseason playoffs when the league operated as Class C (1939–1962), except for 1939 and 1956, and for the three years during World War II when the league did not operate. In the league's one year as Class A (1963), there were also postseason playoffs. After becoming a Rookie league in 1964, the league champions were simply the regular season pennant winners through 1977. Since 1978, postseason playoffs have again been held to determine a league champion.

References

External links

Official website

 
Independent baseball leagues in the United States
Minor baseball leagues in the United States
Sports leagues established in 1939
Professional sports leagues in the United States
Baseball leagues in Utah
Baseball leagues in Idaho
Baseball leagues in Montana
Baseball leagues in Colorado
Baseball leagues in Wyoming